Silverbush or Silver bush may refer to various flowering plants with a silvery appearance including:

Argythamnia
Convolvulus cneorum
Sophora tomentosa subsp. australis